Acting Ka Bhoot is Indian Hindi-language comedy drama film of Mermaid Studio directed by Shashank Kumar and produced by Manoj Narayan Chaudhary, Shashank Kumar and Co-Produced by Kunal, starring by Aham Sharma, Rajni Katiyar, Saanand Verma, Ishtiyak Khan and more. This film about two Con artists with shattered lives and dreams who end up falling in love, while trying to scam each other.

Cast
 Aham Sharma as Akki
 Rajni Katiyar as Geetu
 Saanand Verma as Pankaj
 Ishtiyak Khan as Pintu
 Lilliput (actor) as Kabeer Rana (Rana)
 Mushtaq Khan as Akki's Father
 Anil Rastogi as Akki's Grandfather
 Neeta Mohindra as Akki's Mother
 Manoj Bakshi as Theater Director
 Guru Saran Tiwari as Bachchan Yadav 
 Satyajeet Rajput as Sanju
 Jaineeraj Rajpurohit as Film Director
 Kundan Kumar as Financer
 Jayshankar Tripathi as Inspector 
 Annu Malik as Chitra
 Sharad Vyas as Minister

Production
The Film's Muharat was on 10 November 2021 at Renaissance Hotel, Lucknow. The filming began on 11 November 2021 and finished on 10 December 2021 in Uttar Pradesh.

References

External links 
 

Indian comedy-drama films
2020s Hindi-language films
Upcoming Indian films